ACT Policing is the portfolio of the Australian Federal Police (AFP) responsible for providing policing services to the Australian Capital Territory (ACT). The Australian Capital Territory Police was an independent police force responsible for policing the ACT until 19 October 1979, when it was merged with the Commonwealth Police to form the AFP.

History 
In 1911, the ACT was proclaimed as the seat of Australian government, then the Federal Capital Territory under Commonwealth Government administration. Until 1927, the New South Wales Police patrolled what was mostly rural bushland, except for a small and slowly expanding capital city of Canberra. By the mid-1920s plans were well underway to move Parliament and several Commonwealth Government departments to Canberra and many public buildings were on the verge of being constructed. 

In 1926, the Commonwealth Attorney-General determined that policing in the Territory should be performed by a local force. In 1927, the Federal Capital Territory Police was formed and staffed by 11 men, 10 former Commonwealth Peace Officers and the former NSW Police Sergeant, who had been in charge of the NSW Police contingent in Canberra. The force soon changed its name to the Commonwealth Police (Australian Capital Territory), until 1957 when it formally adopted the name, Australian Capital Territory Police Force. In July 1972 the Aboriginal tent embassy set up by Gary Foley and other notable activists was torn down by ACT police forces for the first time, however many more tents were set up and again torn down by the ACT police. 

On 19 October 1979, as a result of a Commonwealth Government restructure of Australian national policing services, the ACT Police Force amalgamated with the Commonwealth Police to form the Australian Federal Police (AFP). The AFP assumed responsibility for policing the ACT, retaining the role to this day, notable as the ACT attained a degree of self-government in 1989. ACT Policing currently consists of around 923 people of which just over 690 are sworn police.

Female officers

In January 1947, the chief of the Canberra Police advised several applications were received for a police woman position, having previous police experience, and knowledge of child welfare work, but not with any military provost experience.  The first female officer was appointed to the force on 18 April 1947, the first of two positions, from more than twenty applicants.  In plain clothes, they were also originally appointed as probation officers under the Juvenile Offenders (Probation) Ordinance.  By 1976 the ACT Police had 563 male and 17 female officers.

Organisation 

ACT Policing consists of five police stations (patrols) located in the Canberra town centres of Belconnen, City (Civic), Woden, Tuggeranong and Gungahlin Joint Emergency Service Centre. Police Constables based at these stations provide general duties community policing for the ACT. Uniformed traffic operations members work from the Traffic Operations Centre in Belconnen and primarily focus on road safety and traffic law enforcement within the ACT.

The Winchester Police Centre, Benjamin Way, Belconnen, is the ACT Policing Headquarters. The Complex houses ACT Policing's Executive, administrative and support sections and elements of the Criminal Investigations area (CI).

The complex is named in memory of the former Assistant Commissioner Colin Winchester APM, the head of the then ACT Region (ACT Policing) of the AFP. Assistant Commissioner Winchester was murdered outside his house in early 1989.

Major specialist units 
Criminal Investigations (CI) provides a detective function for the ACT, and is located at each of the main police stations (being Tuggeranong, Woden, Belconnen and City) and the Winchester Police Centre.

Specialist Response Group (SRG) provide a full-time tactical response capability in addition to search and rescue, public order management (riot control), police dogs and bomb response functions.

Rank and structure 

As distinct from the majority of AFP Members engaged in duties outside of ACT Policing, who under AFP Commissioner's Order 1 (Administration), are titled Federal Agents, police Members of ACT Policing (and some other AFP portfolios) adopt traditional ranks:
 Constable
 First Constable
 Senior Constable
 Leading Senior Constable
 Sergeant
 Inspector
 Superintendent
 Commander (Deputy Chief Police Officer of the Australian Capital Territory)
 Assistant Commissioner (Chief Police Officer of the Australian Capital Territory)

Those who have sufficient experience and have demonstrated the appropriate competencies are designated as a Detective whilst performing investigative duties in ACT Policing.

Chief police officers 
The title 'Chief Officer' was first used by Lieutenant Colonel Harold Edward Jones from 1927 until his retirement in 1943. During his tenure, Jones also held the positions of Director of the Commonwealth Investigation Bureau and the Superintendent of the Peace Officer Guard. Jones' successor, Robert Reid, was appointed solely to head the ACT Police Force (then titled Commonwealth Police (ACT)). Subsequent commanders of the ACT Police Force used the title Commissioner until the force was amalgamated with the Commonwealth Police in 1979 to form the AFP. 

During Assistant Commissioner Bates' tenure, at the time of ACT self-government commencement in 1989, the title Chief Police Officer was resumed to denote the head of ACT Policing. Whilst remaining within the AFP command structure, the CPO also became accountable to the ACT Government for policing outcomes in the ACT.

In 2001, the position and title of Deputy Chief Police Officer was created. The first incumbent, between 2001 and 2002, was Assistant Commissioner Denis McDermott APM, followed by Assistant Commissioner Andrew Hughes APM between 2002 and 2003. Assistant Commissioner Hughes performed the duties of the Chief Police Officer for most of the period between the death of Assistant Commissioner Fagan APM and the appointment of Assistant Commissioner Phelan APM in 2007. Since 2003, the title of Deputy Chief Police Officer has been used by both Commander rank deputies of the ACT Policing Executive.

Vehicles

See also 
 List of Australian Federal Police killed in the line of duty
ACT Corrective Services

References

External links 
 ACT Policing
 Australian Federal Police
 ACT Chief Police Officer found deceased
 ACT Police Traffic vehicle photos

Australian Federal Police
Emergency services in the Australian Capital Territory
Federal law enforcement agencies of Australia
Law enforcement in capital districts and territories
Law enforcement agencies in the Australian Capital Territory